Scott Randall Baugh (born July 4, 1962) is an American attorney and politician who served in the California State Assembly from 1995 to 2000, representing the 67th District in coastal Orange County, which included Huntington Beach, Cypress, Fountain Valley, La Palma, Los Alamitos, Seal Beach, Westminster, Rossmoor, Sunset Beach, Surfside, and Midway City. In March 2018, Baugh entered the "top two" primary race for California's 48th congressional district seat for the 2018 midterm elections held by Dana Rohrabacher. Baugh finished fourth in the primary.

Baugh was a Republican candidate for California's 47th congressional district in the 2022 election, losing to incumbent Katie Porter.

Early life and education 
Scott Baugh was born in 1962 in Redding, California, to Helen and Cason Baugh. Baugh has four brothers.

In 1984, Baugh earned his Bachelor of Science degree in business administration from Liberty University, graduating summa cum laude. In 1987, Baugh earned his Juris Doctor, with honors, from the McGeorge School of Law. After graduating from law school, Baugh became an attorney in Huntington Beach, California.

Career

1995 election 
In June 1995, Assemblywoman Doris Allen, a Republican, was elected Assembly Speaker solely with the votes of Democratic Assembly members. Her defection prevented Assembly Republicans, who had a bare majority, from electing their choice as speaker. California Republican leaders immediately began organizing a recall election. On September 11, 1995, recall proponents submitted a recall petition with more than 26,000 signatures, qualifying the recall for the ballot. The recall election took place on November 28, 1995, and Allen was recalled by an overwhelming margin, with 65.19% voting to recall her.

Baugh ran as a candidate on the replacement ballot. Baugh was endorsed by Governor Pete Wilson, the Republican Party of Orange County, the Orange County congressional election and dozens of Republican state legislators.

In addition to Baugh, the replacement ballot candidates included former Huntington Beach Councilman Don McAllister; businesswoman Haydee V. Tillotson; Huntington Beach City School District Trustee Shirley Carey; and Linda Moulton-Patterson, a member of the California Coastal Commission and former Huntington Beach councilmember. Moulton-Patterson, the lone Democrat on the ballot, was married to former 5-term Congressman Jerry Patterson.

Tillotson withdrew from the race two weeks before the election, citing concern her continued candidacy would siphon Republican votes and allow Moulton-Patterson, the lone Democrat on the ballot, to win the replacement election. However, Tillotson's name remained on the ballot and she did not endorse another candidate.

Baugh won the replacement election by a comfortable margin, getting 40.9% of the vote.  Moulton-Patterson finished second, with 28.6%. McAllister came in third with 10.1%, Tillotson fourth with 6.56% and Carey last with 4.16%.

Baugh was elected by his Republican colleagues to serve as Assembly Republican Leader in April 1999, a post he held until he was termed out in December 2000.

In the late 1990s, Baugh paid $47,900 in civil fines stemming from violations of California's Political Reform Act.

2018 congressional primary

Orange County Republican Party 
On April 19, 2004, Baugh was elected chairman of the Republican Party of Orange County, succeeding Tom Fuentes. In January 2015, Baugh stepped down as party chair and was replaced by Fred Whitaker.

In March 2007, former Massachusetts Governor Mitt Romney, seeking the GOP nomination for president in 2008, announced that Baugh would serve as a member of his California statewide finance committee.

2022 U.S. House campaign

Baugh is a Republican candidate for California's 47th congressional district in the 2022 election. He advanced to the general election, where he faced incumbent Katie Porter, a Democrat, and lost.

Personal life 
Baugh and his wife Wendy have one son. Baugh lives in Huntington Beach, California.

References

External links

Join California Scott Baugh

|-

1962 births
Candidates in the 2022 United States House of Representatives elections
Liberty University alumni
Living people
McGeorge School of Law alumni
Republican Party members of the California State Assembly
People from Huntington Beach, California
People from Redding, California
Candidates in the 2024 United States House of Representatives elections